Red Hot & Blue is a Memphis style barbecue restaurant franchise founded by political strategist Lee Atwater and former House of Representatives member and Governor of Tennessee Don Sundquist of Memphis, Tennessee, among others.

History
Red Hot and Blue was founded in 1989 by Atwater, Sundquist, Bob Friedman, Joel Wood, and Wendell Moore, with its first location in Arlington, Virginia, near Washington, D.C. Friedman described the concept of the restaurant as "pigs, pork, and blues" as reflected in the company's logo. The name is taken from the title of DJ Dewey Phillips' radio show which aired on WHBQ-AM in Memphis in the 1950s.

Red Hot and Blue is served at George Mason University basketball games at the Patriot Center.

In 2018, AJB Capital acquired Red Hot & Blue through an affiliate fund, announcing plans for substantial reinvestment in the system.

On January 17, 2021, the original executive chef and pitmaster, Ernest "Sonny" McKnight, died due to lung cancer. McKnight was Red Hot & Blue's first employee.

See also
Memphis-style barbecue
 List of barbecue restaurants

References

Restaurants established in 1989
Restaurant chains in the United States
Restaurant franchises
Barbecue restaurants in the United States
Companies based in Winston-Salem, North Carolina
American companies established in 1989
1989 establishments in Virginia